¡Así se quiere en Jalisco! ("That's the way we love in Jalisco!") is a 1942 Mexican film directed by Fernando de Fuentes. It was commented that this was the first Mexican film to be shot in colour. However, a black-and-white version of this film is what actually can be seen in television.

Notes

External links
 

1942 films
1940s Spanish-language films
Cinecolor films
Films based on works by Carlos Arniches
Films directed by Fernando de Fuentes
Mexican romantic drama films
1942 romantic drama films
1940s Mexican films